Opened in 1933, the  Cacapon Resort State Park is located on the eastern slopes of Cacapon Mountain in Morgan County, West Virginia, USA.

Features 
 124-room Lodge (Renovated in 2021)
 12-room Old Inn
 25 cabins (two fully accessible for the disabled)
 Efficiency bungalows
 Full-service restaurant
 Healing Waters Spa
 18 hole, par 72 golf course, designed by Robert Trent Jones
 Lake swimming
 Rowboat and paddle boat rentals
 Shooting Range
 Horseback riding
 Fishing
 Conference rooms
 Picnic Shelters
 Gift Shop
 Tennis courts
 Basketball court
 Volleyball court
 Bicycle trails
 18-basket Disc golf course
 Nearby activities

Accessibility 
Accessibility for the disabled was assessed by West Virginia University. The assessment found the campground, picnic areas, and lake swimming to be accessible.   During the 2005 assessment some issues were identified concerning signage and the width of the sidewalk to the playground. Two of the newest park cabins were specifically designed to be accessible.

See also
List of West Virginia state parks

References

External links 

Golf clubs and courses in West Virginia
Protected areas of Morgan County, West Virginia
Resorts in West Virginia
State parks of West Virginia
Golf clubs and courses designed by Robert Trent Jones
IUCN Category V